Sir George Twisleton 1st Baronet (c. 1605–1635) of Barley, Yorkshire was an English aristocrat.

Biography
George Twisleton was the only son and heir of Christopher Twisleton, and Alice, daughter of —— Haselwood, of Maidwell in Northamptonshire.

Twisleton was created a baronet on 2 April 1629 by King Charles I. He died in October 1635, when the Baronetcy became extinct, and the estate went to his eldest paternal uncle John Twisleton.

Family
George Twisleton married Catherine (died 1672), daughter of Henry Stapylton, of Wighill in Yorkshire, and Mary, daughter of  Sir John Foestee, of Alnwick. After his death she married Sir Henry Cholmeley, of West Newton. She was buried on 14 June 1672, at Oswaldkirk.

Notes

References

Further reading
 — contains details of other family members.

Year of birth uncertain
1635 deaths
Baronets in the Baronetage of England